Williamsdale is a census-designated place (CDP) in St. Clair Township, Butler County, Ohio, United States. The population was 581 at the 2010 census.

Geography
Williamsdale is located in the southern part of St. Clair Township, just north of the village of New Miami. It is in the valley of the Great Miami River but does not actually touch it.

U.S. Route 127 forms the western edge of the CDP, leading south into New Miami and thence into the city of Hamilton, and north to Eaton. The unincorporated community of Overpeck is directly to the northeast, along Hamilton Trenton Road.

Demographics

References 

Census-designated places in Ohio
Census-designated places in Butler County, Ohio